Phygopoda is a genus of beetles in the family Cerambycidae.

Species 
Phygopoda contains the following species:
 Phygopoda agdae (Martins, Galileo & Santos-Silva, 2015)
 Phygopoda birai Wappes & Santos-Silva, 2021
 Phygopoda boliviensis Clarke, 2017
 Phygopoda carellii Wappes & Santos-Silva, 2021
 Phygopoda chaquensis Clarke, 2017
 Phygopoda exilis (Melzer, 1933)
 Phygopoda fugax Thomson, 1864
 Phygopoda fulvitarsis Gounelle, 1911
 Phygopoda hirsuta Wappes & Santos-Silva, 2021
 Phygopoda ingae Penaherrera-Leiva & Tavakilian, 2004
 Phygopoda jacobi Fuchs, 1961
 Phygopoda longiscopifera Clarke, 2017

References

Rhinotragini